The   is a historic hotel in Yokohama, Japan, overlooking Yamashita Park. It opened in 1927, four years after the Great Kantō earthquake devastated much of the city.

The hotel was used as accommodation by American troops during the occupation of Japan following World War II; one of the hotel suites is set aside and maintained just as it was furnished when General Douglas MacArthur stayed there, his first night in Japan during the occupation. The hotel is believed to be the place where the famous yoshoku dish naporitan was invented by a head chef. 

In 1991, an eighteen-story tower was built as an expansion of the hotel.

Gallery

References

External links
 Official website

Hotels in Yokohama
Hotel New Grand
Hotels established in 1927
Hotel buildings completed in 1927
Hotel buildings completed in 1991
Preferred Hotels & Resorts
Art Deco architecture in Japan